Moritz Nicolas (born 21 October 1997) is a German professional footballer who plays as a goalkeeper for Eerste Divisie club Roda JC, on loan from Borussia Mönchengladbach.

Career
Nicolas joined Bundesliga club Union Berlin on loan from Borussia Mönchengladbach in mid-2019, with the deal lasting until June 2021. He made his professional debut for Union in the Bundesliga on 20 June 2020, starting in the away match against 1899 Hoffenheim. His loan was cut short on 15 August 2020.

The same day, Nicolas joined VfL Osnabrück on a season-long loan.

On 15 July 2021, he went to FC Viktoria Köln on loan.

On 17 August 2022, Nicolas moved to Roda JC Kerkrade in the Netherlands on loan.

References

External links
 
 
 
 

1997 births
Living people
People from Gladbeck
Sportspeople from Münster (region)
Association football goalkeepers
Footballers from North Rhine-Westphalia
German footballers
Germany youth international footballers
Germany under-21 international footballers
Rot-Weiss Essen players
Borussia Mönchengladbach II players
Borussia Mönchengladbach players
1. FC Union Berlin players
VfL Osnabrück players
FC Viktoria Köln players
Roda JC Kerkrade players
Bundesliga players
Regionalliga players
3. Liga players
German expatriate footballers
Expatriate footballers in the Netherlands
German expatriate sportspeople in the Netherlands